Haplochromis pseudopellegrini is a species of cichlid populating Africa's freshwater Lake Victoria.  This species can reach a length of  SL.

Lifestyle
Haplochromis pseudopellegrini is a carnivore that is usually in close offshore areas and some deep areas, and near the lake's muddy floor.

Diet
Haplochromis pseudopellegrini feeds on other freshwater fish in its lake habitat. There is little data on the cichlid's exact diet. The cichlid is harmless to humans.

References

pseudopellegrini
Taxa named by Humphry Greenwood
Fish described in 1967
Fish of Lake Victoria
Taxonomy articles created by Polbot